Farhād Khān, also known as Nizam-e-Zamanah or Nizam-e-Zaman, was a Mughal military strategist who had many positions throughout his life. He was the most well-known Faujdar of Sylhet Sarkar, governing in the late 17th century during the reign of Mughal emperor Aurangzeb. He was renowned for the construction of numerous bridges and places of worship in the region.

Career

Farhad was the thanadar of Bhalwa (Noakhali). In the 1665 Conquest of Chittagong, the Firingis led by Captain Moor set fire to Arakanese fleets and fled to Bhalwa (Noakhali) where Farhad gave them refuge. Farhad later sent them off to the Subahdar of Bengal Shaista Khan in Jahangirnagar. In response, the Subahdar launched a December expedition led by his son Buzurg Umed Khan and ordered Farhad to join the fleet of Ibn Husayn and Zamindar Munawwar Khan. Shaista Khan also ordered Mir Murtaza, the superintendent of artillery, to join and protect Farhad. On 2 January, the fleet split ways with Farhad and Murtaza going through land with the other leaders going through the river. Following the successful conquest, Farhad was awarded with a rank as a mansabdar of Hazar-o-Pansadi (1500 soldiers under his command) and 350 horses.

In 1670, Farhad became the faujdar of Sylhet succeeding Mahafata Khan. In the same year, he granted 27.25 hals of land to Syed Muhammad Najat Khan of Sylhet, whose heir was Ahsanullah, in the parganas of Kauria and Atuajan. Farhad built the single-domed Bara Gambuz hall south of Shah Jalal's Dargah in 1677. It had octagonal towers on its four corners and arched openings. The eastern part of the mosque had a large arched entrance with two smaller arched entrances on either side. The inscription was on the top of the main flat-arched entrance. Farhad was also responsible for the construction of a three-domed mosque and Shah Jalal dargah complex, in 1678, south of the Bara Gambuz. Farhad appointed a descendant of Shams ad-Din Kamali as the imam of the mosque, who would later become a mufti and found the Mufti Family of Sylhet.

In 1678, Khan gifted 5.75  of land to Ratneshwar Chakraborty in Longla Pargana. He also granted land to Ramapati Chakrabarti, father of Srikrishna Chakrabarty of Ita, in Alinagar Pargana as well as giving land in Bejura Pargana to Ramkanta Chakrabarti of Qasimnagar, whose heir was Balaram Bisharad. In 1684, Khan built another mosque in Raihusayn Mahalla (Rainagar). The ruins of another mosque established by Khan can also be seen south-west of Dargah Mahalla (west of the former Sylhet Police lines during the British rule). In 1688, he built the Gualichorra Bridge.

Farhad Khan left Sylhet for a short while in 1678. He served as the 5th faujdar of Chittagong (then known as Islamabad) with Husayn Quli Khan as his Dewan and Mir Jafar as his Bakshi. Ghatforhadbeg (Ghat Farhad Beg), a ghat which used to be on the Karnaphuli is named after him. He returned to Sylhet in 1689.

Khan established the Sylhet Shahi Eidgah, the largest eidgah of its kind in the region. The bridge located in Mirabazar-Shibganj road is still known as Farhad Khaner Pul (Farhad Khan's bridge) today. The bridge over Mulnicherra was also built by Khan.

Deputies
Farhad Khan had a number of naib-faujdars who would also, like Khan, grant land to residents in Sylhet. They held the title of Nawab. Nawab Syed Muhammad Ali Khan Qaimjung, Naib in 1680, granted land to zamindars such as Jamabakhsh Faqir of Chowallish in 1680, Ramshankar Bhattacharya of Shamshernagar, Kalikanta Chakrabarty of Panchakhanda, Gangadhar Sharma of Baniachong and Ramchandra Chakrabarti of Pathariya. Nawab Nasrullah Khan, Naib in 1683, granted land to Pandit Ramgovinda Bhattacharjee in Chowallish. In 1685, Nawab Abd ar-Rahman Khan was the Naib-Faujdar.

|-

|-

See also
History of Noakhali
History of Sylhet

References

Rulers of Sylhet
Rulers of Noakhali
Mughal Empire people
17th-century Indian monarchs
17th-century Indian Muslims